The York Spit Light was a lighthouse located at the mouth of the York River in the Chesapeake Bay, marking a long shoal paralleling the main channel into the river.

History
This light replaced lightships stationed at this location beginning in 1853. Extra fender piles were added to the usual six pile structure in order to provide extra stability against the current. In 1903, riprap was placed around the piles for additional protection. A hurricane in September 1933 damaged the light.

The house was removed and replaced with an automated light in 1960 as part of the program of decommissioning at that time. More recently, this light was damaged in a hurricane, and a separate light on a single pole was erected next to the old screw-pile foundation.

Notes

References
York Spit Light, from the Chesapeake Chapter of the United States Lighthouse Society

Lighthouses completed in 1870
Lighthouses completed in 1960
Lighthouses in Virginia
Lighthouses in the Chesapeake Bay
Buildings and structures demolished in 1960
1870 establishments in Virginia
1960 disestablishments in Virginia